MB Roland Distillery is Kentucky's first modern completely "grain to glass" craft distillery, located in Pembroke, Kentucky since its inception in 2009.

History 
The MB Roland Distillery was founded by Paul & Merry Beth ("MB") Tomaszewski in 2009 as The site of the distillery sits on a former Amish family farm.

Spirits 
The distillery offers several spirits, including moonshine, malt whiskey, corn whiskey, wheat whiskey, rye whiskey, bourbon whiskey, and other flavored moonshines.

References

Bourbon whiskey
Distilleries in Kentucky